Dragovšek is a dispersed settlement in the  hills west of Šmartno pri Litiji in central Slovenia. The area is part of the historical region of Lower Carniola. The Municipality of Šmartno pri Litiji is now included in the Central Slovenia Statistical Region.

Notable people
Notable people that were born or lived in Dragovšek include:
Josip Marn (1832–1893), literary historian

References

External links
Dragovšek at Geopedia

Populated places in the Municipality of Šmartno pri Litiji